Park Ha-na (born July 25, 1985) is a South Korean actress. Park made her entertainment debut in 2003 as a member of the idol group FUNNY. Since then, she has turned to acting and was in the lead role in Apgujeong Midnight Sun (2014).

Career

In 2016, Ha-na played the villainous and psychotic Jang Se-jin in the daily drama melodrama The Promise.

After that, she appeared in the daily drama Still Loving You as the evil and spoiled heiress Kim Bit-na.

In 2018, she began appearing as the protagonist Hong Se-yeon in Mysterious Personal Shopper. Recently, she starred as the lead female in  Fatal Promise.

Filmography

Film

Television series

Web series

Television  show

Music video

Discography

Awards and nominations

Notes

References

External links 

 Park Ha-na at FN Entertainment 
  
 

1985 births
Living people
South Korean television actresses
South Korean film actresses